Karalyn Eve Patterson,   is a British psychologist in Department of Clinical Neurosciences, University of Cambridge and MRC Cognition and Brain Sciences Unit. She is a specialist in cognitive neuropsychologyand an Emeritus Fellow of Darwin College, Cambridge.

Early life and education
Patterson was born in Chicago and attended South Shore High School, Chicago, from which she graduated in 1961. She completed her Doctor of Philosophy (PhD) at the University of California, San Diego, in 1971.

Career and research
In 1975, Patterson moved to England to take a position at the Applied Psychology Unit of the Medical Research Council (MRC) in Cambridge.

Awards and honours
Patterson is one of a select group of academics that are fellows of both the Royal Society, the UK's national academy for science, and the British Academy, the UK's national academy for humanities and social sciences. Her nomination for the Royal Society reads: 

In 2020, Patterson was awarded the Suffrage Science Life Sciences Award.

Personal life

In addition to her academic roles, Patterson has an interest in food and wine, and has served as a wine steward at Darwin College, Cambridge. Patterson is married to Roy D. Patterson.

References

Living people
Female Fellows of the Royal Society
Fellows of the British Academy
Fellows of the Academy of Medical Sciences (United Kingdom)
British psychologists
Fellows of Darwin College, Cambridge
British neuroscientists
British women neuroscientists
Fellows of the Royal Society
1943 births
University of California, San Diego alumni
Place of birth missing (living people)